List of firsts for aviation in Australia or for Australian aviators.

International

National

Regional

Images
 E.A Crome collection of photographs on aviation at National Library of Australia
 Horrie Miller aviation photograph collection at National Library of Australia
 Sam Hood collection of photographs (including aviation) at Mitchell Library of State Library of New South Wales

See also
Category:Australian aviators
List of circumnavigations
List of firsts in aviation
Oswald Watt Gold Medal

References

Further reading
 Brogden, Stanley (1960), "History of Australian Aviation", The Hawthorn Press. 
 Copley, Gregory R. (1976), "Australians in the Air" foreword by Sir Norman Brearley, Rigby. 
 Gibson, Ron J. (1971), "Australia and Australians in Civil Aviation, An Index to Events, Volume 1 1823 - 1920" 
 Lee, Adam (2008), "Australian Aviation, A Pictorial History", Axiom Publishing.

External links
  Trove at National Library of Australia

Aviation history of Australia
Australian aviators
Aviation pioneers
Aviation records
Australia aviation-related lists
Aviation
Australia-related lists of superlatives